William Onico Barker (born November 6, 1934) is an American politician who served as a member of the Virginia Senate from 1980 to 1992. He ran for the Republican nomination to succeed Dan Daniel in Congress in 1988 but lost to Reagan White House aide Linda Arey.

References

External links
 

1934 births
Living people
Republican Party Virginia state senators
20th-century American politicians